Fort Hill, John C Calhoun House and libraries', is a National Historic Landmark on the Clemson University campus in Clemson, South Carolina, United States. The house is significant as the home of John C. Calhoun, the 7th Vice President of the United States, from 1825 to 1850. It is now a house for museums and libraries.

History

The house was originally built as a four-room house about 1803 and was called Clergy Hall by Dr. James McElhenny, who was the pastor of Hopewell Presbyterian Church.  The house later became the home of John C. Calhoun and his wife Floride Calhoun in 1825. Calhoun enlarged it to 14 rooms and renamed it Fort Hill for nearby Fort Rutledge, which was built around 1776. The architectural style is Greek revival with Federal detailing and with simple interior detailing.

After John Calhoun's death in 1850, the property and the 50 slaves there passed to his wife to be shared with three of her children: Cornelia, John, and Anna Maria, wife of Thomas Green Clemson. Anna sold her share to Floride Calhoun. Floride Calhoun sold the plantation to her son, Andrew Pickens Calhoun, and held the mortgage. After Andrew died in 1865, she filed for foreclosure against Andrew's heirs before her death in 1866. After lengthy legal proceedings, the plantation was auctioned at Walhalla in 1872. The executor of her estate won the auction, which was divided among her surviving heirs. Thomas Green and Anna Clemson moved into Fort Hill in 1872. After Anna's death in 1875, Thomas Green Clemson inherited Fort Hill. Clemson University has operated Fort Hill as a house museum as stipulated in the will. The house is all that remains of what was once an extensive plantation estate.

The home was designated a National Historic Landmark in 1960.

Fort Hill was closed for a two-year restoration project and was reopened in the spring of 2003. Fort Hill was named a national treasure by the Save America's Treasures program, and its artifacts are currently undergoing a comprehensive conservation program funded by this federal grant and matching funds.

See also
List of National Historic Landmarks in South Carolina
National Register of Historic Places listings in Pickens County, South Carolina

References

External links

Fort Hill: National Historic Landmark, at Clemson University
Fort Hill, Pickens County (Clemson University), including 12 photos, at South Carolina Department of Archives and History

Fort Hill Historical Marker

Houses completed in 1803
Clemson University campus
National Historic Landmarks in South Carolina
Historic American Buildings Survey in South Carolina
Houses on the National Register of Historic Places in South Carolina
National Register of Historic Places in Pickens County, South Carolina
Calhoun family
Museums in Pickens County, South Carolina
Historic house museums in South Carolina
University museums in South Carolina
Libraries in South Carolina
Houses in Pickens County, South Carolina
Clemson, South Carolina
Historic district contributing properties in South Carolina
Plantations in South Carolina
Plantation houses in South Carolina
John C. Calhoun